CD180 antigen is a protein that in humans is encoded by the CD180 gene.

CD180 is a cell surface molecule consisting of extracellular leucine-rich repeats (LRR) and a short cytoplasmic tail. It is also known by the archaic terms Bgp-95 and RP105, for the founding designations following discovery in humans (1988) and mice (1994), respectively. CD180 is expressed on antigen presenting cells including B cells and dendritic cells. The extracellular LRR is associated with a molecule called MD-1 and form the cell surface receptor complex, CD180/MD-1. It belongs to the family of pathogen receptors, Toll-like receptors (TLR). CD180/MD-1, by working in concert with TLR4, controls B cell recognition and signaling of lipopolysaccharide (LPS), a membrane constituent of Gram-negative bacteria.

Recently, CD180 has been demonstrated to be involved in the survival and prognosis of B-cell chronic lymphocytic leukemia.

References

Further reading

External links 
 
 
 

Clusters of differentiation